The 2007 Nigerian Senate election in Borno State was held on April 21, 2007, to elect members of the Nigerian Senate to represent Borno State. Omar Hambagda representing Borno South, Maina Maaji Lawan representing Borno North and Kaka Mallam Yale representing Borno Central all won on the platform of the All Nigeria Peoples Party.

Overview

Summary

Results

Borno South 
The election was won by Omar Hambagda of the All Nigeria Peoples Party.

Borno North 
The election was won by Maina Maaji Lawan of the All Nigeria Peoples Party.

Borno Central 
The election was won by Kaka Mallam Yale of the All Nigeria Peoples Party.

References 

April 2007 events in Nigeria
Borno State Senate elections
Bor